Adriano Gonçalves (5 March 1932 – 13 July 2013), known by his stage name Bana and called the "King of Morna", was a Cape Verdean singer and performer of the morna style, the plaintive, melodic lament which is a staple musical style of the country.

Biography 
He was born in Mindelo on 5 March 1932, some sources said he was born on 11 March.  In his childhood years, he was surrounded by music with local singers.  At age four, he appeared with local singers.

Bana, who was over seven feet tall, began his musical career during Portuguese colonial rule, when he worked as a handyman and bodyguard for the legendary Cabo Verdean composer and performer, B. Leza.  In the 1950s, the singer, uncle of Cesária Évora taught Bana and many other artists the art of morna songs.  In 1958, BeLeza was presented at a round with the Tuna Académica da Coimbra which took place in São Vicente Island.  Among the attendees were Portuguese poet and political dissident Manuel Alegre and Portuguese writer, poet and novelist Fernando Assis Pacheco who tried to take him to Portugal to act.  After B. Leza died, he began working in his own.  Perhaps because of his popularity, Bana was accused of collaboration with the Portuguese colonial government, after his son's birthday near Amilcarthe Cabral's death. He later went to Dakar, Senegal where he recorded his first album in 1962 and gave his first performance, the record had four songs, 2,000 copies were sold within the first weeks.

Afterwards he moved to Europe in a few months, first to Paris which he remained until 1968, there Bana made two LPs including Pensamento e segredo and Bana à Paris, Bana later moved to Rotterdam in the Netherlands where he made a group "Voz de Cabo Verde" ("Voice of Cape Verde") with other exiled Cape Verdeans including Luís Morais (1934–2002), Jean da Lomba, Morgadinho, Toy de Bibha, Frank Cavaquinho and several others, he also published two "long-plays" and six EPs.  In 1969 he headed southwest to Portugal where he opened "Restaurante Monte Cara" in Lisbon, named after one of the island's prominent feature Monte Cara west of Mindelo (also Casa de Cabo Verde), he met two of his friends, Luís Morais e Morgadinho.  Also named after the prominent feature Discos Monte Cara, a record company (one of the first Cape Verde) he would establish.    Bana created a sound which was the style of Cape Verdean bands, his discs were sold in his native island and other islands in Cape Verde and the Cape Verdeans in Portugal, Italy, France, Guinea-Bissau, Mozambique and the eastern United States were recognized in mora songs in Cape Verdean creole, Bana's with the voice of the folk was heard around the world.

After Cape Verdean independence, he returned to his country, Bana was accused with helping the colonial powers, had to run away from killing protesters and shortly returned to Lisbon.  Seven years later, he was apologized by the Government of Cape Verde and returned to his country.  In 1986, after forty years of singing, Bana chose to retire after finishing his Cape Verdean tour.  In 1998, Bana recorded his album Gira Sol which was produced by Ramiro Mendes for MB Records.

He was "ambassador" of Cape Verdean music, he was a pioneer that took to the four corners of Europe and Africa.

Bana again returned to France in the late 1980s, there, he was one of the first Cape Verdean to operate a multinational record company, based in Paris named Lusafrica (founded by José da Silva) mainly attracting artists from Lusophony Africa and outside, particularly the United States, other parts of West and Middle Africa and some immigrants to France.  During his 57 year long career, Bana recorded around a hundred LPs and EPs in group and solo, he appeared in two films, two in French, one in German and one in Portuguese/Cape Verdean.

In his last years, Bana sang Cape Verdean mornas and coladeiras and was accompanied by a traditional band and by the orchestra of S. Jorge de Arroios.

In his eightieth year, he performed a concert in Lisbon and featured other singers who honoured hom: Lura, Tito Paris, Nancy Vieira, Titina, Jorge Neto, Luís Fortes, Té Macedo, Jorge Silva, Luz María, Morgadinho, Leonel Almeida, Coimbra, Dany Silva and several others.

He received the Grand Merit medal by the President of Cape Verde along with the Portuguese president.  He was honored in 2012 at the Cabo Verde Music Awards for his long career.

Suffering from poor health during the last years of his life, Bana died in 2013 at Loures hospital in Portugal, at the age of 81, after suffering from an episode of sepsis, leaving a wife and 8 children. According to his last will, his body will be cremated.

Relatives 
One of his cousins was another Cape Verdean singer Eddy Moreno, and his other cousins and distant cousins were several of the singers of the Xalino family including Armando, Eduardo, Val, Xante and Zuca, also he was related to Djô d'Eloy.

Discography

Albums 
Bana has recorded two songs and 41 albums.
 Nha Terra (1965)
 Pensamento e Segredo (1965)
 L. Morais (1967)
 A Paris or Bana á Paris (Bana In Paris) (1968)
 Recordano (Recording) (1969)
 Rotcha-Nu (1970)
 So Coladeras! (1971)
 Coladeras: The Best of Bana (1972)
 Contratempo (1974)
 Cidália (1976)
 Miss Unidos (1977)
 O encanto de Cabo Verde (1982)
 Dor di nha dor (1984)
 Gira sol (1998)
 Acaba comingo Ao vivo no Coliseu (Live at the Colosseum)
 Bana – a voz de ouro – mornas (Bana – Voice of Gold – Mornas)
 Bana canta a magia Cap-Vert (recorded in Paris)
 Bana e sua orquestra Camin de Maderalzim Canto de amores (Songs of Love)
 Fado Ganha gasta Gardenia Livro infinite (Endless Book)
 Mandamentos/Sodad II María Barba e Tunga Tunghinha Avenida Marginal – named after the street which runs from the center to the northwest of Mindelo all within Mindelo Bay, the Port of Mindelo is in the middle of the avenue
 As melhores mornas de sempre Merecimento de mãe Morabeza Mornas inesquecíveis Mornas e coladeiras (Mornas and Coladeiras, also as Mornas e coladeras)
 Mostero nha tentação Perseguida (Persecution)
 Pilon iletrico (Electric Pylon)
 Solidão Teresa La Zandunga Singles 
 "Bobista, Nha Terra" ("Boa Vista, Our Land")/"Oh Boy!" (1979), by Celina Pereira, Discos Monte Cara
 "Feel Good" (1979/80)
 "Cabinda a Cunene" (1998)
 "Badiu di fora"
 "Canta cu alma sem ser magoado", originally by Pedro Rodrigues
 "De bes"
 "Teresinha", originally by Ti Goi

 Collaboration 
 A single with Maria João in 1999

 References 

 Bibliography 
Ochoa, Raquel, Bana, Uma vida a cantar Cabo Verde (Bana, Life of a Cape Verdean Singer''), published by Planeta Vivo, 2008.

External links 
Bana at Rate Your Music
Official website

1932 births
2013 deaths
20th-century Cape Verdean male singers
Morna (music) singers
People from Mindelo
Singers from São Vicente, Cape Verde